St John Fisher Catholic Voluntary Academy (formerly St John Fisher Catholic High School) is a Roman Catholic Mixed Comprehensive in Dewsbury, West Yorkshire, England.

St John Fisher was opened in 1958 under the trusteeship of the Roman Catholic Diocese of Leeds to serve Catholics living in Dewsbury, Batley and the surrounding areas. It was reorganised in 1974 and the Sixth Form was added in 1979.

The school, an 11–19 mixed Roman Catholic secondary school, has about 1200 pupils on roll, including 200 in the sixth form. It has also been a specialist Sports College since 2005.  the school's headteacher is Richard Williams until August 2020 when Sarah Wilkinson will become head but now as of 2022 Jackie Rose is the temporary Head Teacher .

History
St John Fisher, built at a cost of was £225,000, was designed to accommodate 500 pupils of secondary modern standard. George Dwyer, Bishop of Leeds, opened the school in 1958 to provide a Roman Catholic education to the children of the Heavy Woollen District. In 1958 the initial intake of pupils included children from St Joseph's (Batley Carr), St Mary's, St Paulinus, St Patrick's (Birstall) and Holy Spirit (Heckmondwike). In 1974, an all-ability comprehensive intake was granted. After a campaign by governors, staff and parents, a Sixth Form was added.

St John Fisher celebrated its Golden Jubilee in 2008. This was marked by a number of special events, such as an open-air mass, a festival of sport and various pilgrimages by the different year groups in school. 

In the GCSE results of 2009, 75% of students attained 5 A*-C grades, the highest percentage ever achieved by the school.  However, only 38% of pupils achieved 5 A*-C including English and Mathematics, ranking St John Fisher 16th out of the 25 maintained secondary schools in Kirklees for this measure.

St John Fisher Catholic High School converted to academy status on 1 October 2014 and was renamed St John Fisher Catholic Voluntary Academy.

Motto and Logo
The school motto is "Per Crucem Vincemus", Latin for "through the cross we shall conquer" (though the school no longer offers either Latin or classics as a subject). The logo is a red and white shield with a green fish in front of it. The motto is always written beneath it.

Extracurricular activities
The school currently runs trips in Year 7 – bushcraft and team building, Year 9 retreat to Ampleforth and Ardeche outdoor ed in France, Year 9 Battlefields, Year 10 Lourdes and a ski trip for Year 11 and Sixth Form every other year. The Sixth Form also go to New York every other year. Visits to further and higher education take place from Year 9 upwards and other day visits take place to scientific, historical, religious or cultural places.
The school holds academic and sports awards evening. At these evenings, pupils are presented with awards for outstanding achievement or effort within school or sport. The Sixth Form performs a Live Crib at Christmas and a Re-enactiment of the Crucifixion on Good Friday, both outside the United Reformed Church in Dewsbury. 
There are a wealth of sports clubs on offer to students with rugby league an area of excellence in the school.

Uniform
The school colours of black, grey, dark red and white are present in the uniform that consists of a black blazer and trousers, white shirt, school tie and black shoes for all.

Sixth Form
The Sixth Form is now in its 27th year. Although religious criteria apply to lower school admissions, the Sixth Form considers all applications and offers BTEC First Awards to those not achieving sufficient GCSE grades to study at A-Level. Sixth Form A-Level curriculum includes the humanities, sciences, ITC, music, visual arts and design, PE, and Business Studies. Particular to St John Fisher at A-Level is Theology, Theatre Studies, Psychology and Law.

The Sixth Form is also responsible for electing the male and female School Presidents.

Notable former pupils
Arthur Roche – Bishop of Leeds
Francis Cummins – rugby player for Leeds Rhinos
Matt Diskin – rugby player for Leeds Rhinos, & played internationally for Great Britain & England
Victoria O'Keefe (1969–1990) – stage and film actor best known for playing nuclear war survivor Jane Beckett in made-for-TV movie "Threads" (1984).

References

External links
The School Website

Secondary schools in Kirklees
Catholic secondary schools in the Diocese of Leeds
Educational institutions established in 1958
Schools in Dewsbury
1958 establishments in England
Academies in Kirklees